Sergei Nikolayevich Silkin (born 2 March 1961) is a Russian professional football coach and a former player. He made his professional debut in the Soviet Top League in 1983 for FC Dynamo Moscow.

Coaching record

Honours
 Soviet Top League runner-up: 1986.

European club competitions
With FC Dynamo Moscow.

 European Cup Winners' Cup 1984–85: 4 games.
 UEFA Cup 1987–88: 4 games.

References

1961 births
People from Lyubertsy
Living people
Soviet footballers
Russian footballers
Russian expatriate footballers
Expatriate footballers in Belgium
FC Dynamo Moscow players
FC Dinamo Minsk players
FC Tyumen players
Soviet Top League players
Russian Premier League players
Russian football managers
FC Dynamo Moscow managers
Russian Premier League managers
Association football defenders
Sportspeople from Moscow Oblast